Alfred Ross may refer to:

Alfred Ross (politician) (1816–1896), merchant, banker and politician in colonial Victoria (Australia)
Alf Ross (1899–1979), Danish legal and moral philosopher

See also
Samuel Alfred Ross (1870–1929), Liberian politician
Alfred Clunies-Ross (c. 1851–1903), Cocos Island-born rugby union player, represented Scotland
Al Ross (disambiguation)